Plasmodium intabazwe is a parasite of the genus Plasmodium subgenus Lacertamoeba.

As in all Plasmodium species, P.  intabazwe has both vertebrate and insect hosts. The vertebrate hosts for this parasite are reptiles.

Taxonomy 
This parasite was first described by van As et al in 2016.

Distribution 
This species is found in Africa and nearby islands.

Hosts
This parasite infects the common crag lizard (Pseudocordylus melanotus).

References 

intabazwe